Trechus nannus is a species of ground beetle found in eastern Africa.

References

nannus
Beetles described in 1935